My Head Is an Animal is the debut studio album by the Icelandic indie folk band Of Monsters and Men, released through Record Records in Iceland on 20 September 2011. After their success, topping the Icelandic charts with their debut single, "Little Talks", the band signed with Universal Music Group and the album was released internationally through Republic Records on 3 April 2012. The title of the album comes from the second line in "Dirty Paws".

Cover art
The front of the international release is a photograph that Brynjar's grandfather took of his friend.  The original was black and white; Arnar Hilmarsson added the coloring. The back is a family photograph that Ragnar found in his family pictures.

The pictures on the front and back of the Icelandic release depict men dressed for the Icelandic national sport of Glima.

Release and promotion

Singles
"Little Talks" was released as the debut single by the band, and the lead single from My Head Is an Animal on 20 December 2011, after it had been released as a promo to radio stations in the US and Europe in July 2011. The single propelled the band to nationwide popularity in the US, and has so far sold a million copies there. The success of the single in the US led to the band's signing with Universal Music Group, and the single, along with a revised version of My Head Is an Animal was released in North America on 3 April 2012. The music video for the song debuted in February 2012.

"Dirty Paws" served as the second single from My Head Is an Animal in the UK and Ireland. It was released on 12 April 2012, in the lead up to the album's re-release in Europe. A promotional single followed in June.

"Six Weeks" was released as a promotional single from the album in the UK and Ireland. It was released as a digital download on 27 August 2012.

"Mountain Sound" was released in the US as the second single from the album, and the fourth overall. Seeing a release worldwide as the follow-up to "Little Talks" as well, it was released on 2 September 2012. A music video to accompany the single was released on 24 September.

Reception

Critical reception

The album received positive reviews from music critics. On Metacritic it currently holds a rating of 66/100, signifying generally favourable reviews.

Commercial performance
The album debuted in the United States at number six on the Billboard 200, selling 55,000 units in its first week alone. This marked the best chart performance for an Icelandic musical artist in U.S. history. The previous chart record was held by Björk's Volta, which peaked at number nine on the Billboard 200 in 2009.  In January 2014, the band announced via Facebook that the album had achieved platinum certification in the United States.  As of June 2015, the album has sold 1.1 million copies in the US.

Track listing
All songs are credited to Of Monsters and Men, but were actually written by the band's individuals and/or others. The actual writers are listed alongside the tracks.

Personnel

Of Monsters and Men
Arnar Rósenkranz Hilmarsson – drums, percussion
Árni Guðjónsson – accordion, piano, organ
Brynjar Leifsson – electric and baritone guitar
Kristján Páll Kristjánsson – bass guitar
Nanna Bryndís Hilmarsdóttir – vocals, acoustic guitar
Ragnar Þórhallsson – vocals, acoustic guitar

Additional musicians
Ari Bragi Kárason – trumpet
Ragnhildur Gunnarsdóttir – trumpet
Bergrún Snæbjörnsdóttir – French horn

Production (Icelandic release)
Of Monsters and Men – producer on all tracks
Aron Arnarsson – producer, engineer, mixing on all tracks
Styrmir Hauksson – mastering
Arnar Rósenkranz Hilmarsson – artwork, design
Nanna Bryndís Hilmarsdóttir – artwork, design
Ragnar Þórhallsson – artwork, design

Production (US release)
Of Monsters and Men – producer on tracks 1, 2, 5, 6, 7, 8, 9, 10, 11, 12
Aron Arnarsson – engineer, producer on tracks 1, 2, 5, 6, 7, 8, 9, 10, 12
Jacquire King – producer on tracks 2, 3, 4, 11
Craig Silvey – mixing
Greg Calbi – mastering
Arnar Rósenkranz Hilmarsson – artwork, design
Ragnar Þórhallsson – artwork, design

Music and lyric videos
All music and lyric videos (except for the "Mountain Sound" music video, filmed live in Iceland) were produced and directed by Canadian production firm WeWereMonkeys. To create the video series, WeWereMonkeys drew inspiration from Nordic Mythology, suggestions from the band members and lyrics of the songs, to which they listened "over and over". They also travelled to Iceland, where they studied the landscape, in order to get ideas for the videos' settings. Several techniques were employed in the production, from live action to CGI, from stop-motion to digital painting.
The videos were praised, with the "Little Talks" music video receiving a nomination in the 2012 MTV Video Music Awards for "Best Art Direction in a Video".

Music videos

Lyric videos

Charts

Weekly charts

Year-end charts

Decade-end charts

Certifications and sales

References

2011 debut albums
Of Monsters and Men albums
Republic Records albums
Albums produced by Jacquire King